Ahmadnagar (Ahmad Nagar) (احمد نگر) is a town in the Chiniot District of Punjab province in Pakistan.

This old town still have some buildings, over 150 years old. After the independence of Pakistan, many Ahmadies moved in this town. While Rabwah (now Chennab Nagar) was under construction, Ahmadies built their Jamia, boarding house and other buildings.

Ahmad Nagar has Primary and High Schools for boys and a high school for girls. There are several private English schools, one of them is Jabbar Coaching Centre, the oldest one. The first student of this school was Sultan Zafar.

Ahmad Nagar has a Government Hospital and many private clinics.

The main sports of the town are Cricket and Kabaddi, however, youth were used to play hockey, badminton, soccer, mero dabba, gully danda, and many other local games.

Ahmad Nagar was in District Jhang, but now it's in Chiniot District.

Geography
Ahmadnagar is a town situated at the Faisalabad to Sargodha road in the Chiniot District.

History
In 997 CE, Sultan Mahmud Ghaznavi, took over the Ghaznavid dynasty empire established by his father, Sultan Sebuktegin, In 1005 he conquered the Shahis in Kabul in 1005, and followed it by the conquests of Punjab region. The Delhi Sultanate and later Mughal Empire ruled the region. The Punjab region became predominantly Muslim due to missionary Sufi saints whose dargahs dot the landscape of Punjab region.

After the decline of the Mughal Empire, the Sikh invaded and occupied Chiniot District. The Muslims faced severe restrictions during the Sikh rule. During the period of British rule, Chiniot District increased in population and importance.

The predominantly Muslim population supported Muslim League and Pakistan Movement. After the independence of Pakistan in 1947, the minority Hindus and Sikhs migrated to India while the Muslims refugees from India settled down in Ahmadnagar.

Ahmadnagar has a Dargah of Shah Fateh Ali (nicknamed Shah Fatailee). There used to be annual urs at this place.

Recently Ahmadnagar came into TV news - unable to load the video

Demography
The population of the town is Muslim and speak Punjabi and Urdu languages.

See also
 Bhawana
 Chenab Nagar
 Chiniot
 Lalian

Chiniot District
Populated places in Chiniot District